The Great Plains Coliseum is a 3,000-seat multi-purpose arena in Lawton, Oklahoma, USA. It hosts local sporting events and concerts.

It was home to the Lawton-Fort Sill Cavalry, who last played in 2011, and the 580 RollerGirls, who started play in 2011.

External links
Arena website

Sports venues in Oklahoma
Indoor arenas in Oklahoma
Lawton, Oklahoma
Buildings and structures in Comanche County, Oklahoma
Continental Basketball Association venues
Basketball venues in Oklahoma